Shooting at the 1936 Summer Olympics in Berlin saw the reintroduction of 50 metre pistol (then called Free Pistol) but still only had three events. The competitions were held from 6 to 8 August 1936 at the shooting ranges at Wannsee. Germany succeeded only in winning one of the three gold medals; the others went to Scandinavians after great accomplishments: Torsten Ullman won Free Pistol with a margin of 15 points and a new world record, and Willy Røgeberg achieved the maximum score in the Prone event.

Medal summary

Participating nations
A total of 141 shooters from 29 nations competed at the Berlin Games:

Medal table

References

External links
 International Olympic Committee medal winners database

 
1936 Summer Olympics events
1936
Olympics
Shooting competitions in Germany